Tokaj wine region or Tokaj-Hegyalja wine region (short Tokaj-Hegyalja or Hegyalja) is a historical wine region located in northeastern Hungary and southeastern Slovakia. It is also one of the seven larger wine regions of Hungary. Hegyalja means "foothills" in Hungarian, and this was the original name of the region.

The region consists of 28 named villages and 11,149 hectares of classified vineyards, of which an estimated 5,500 are currently planted. Tokaj has been declared a World Heritage Site in 2002 under the name Tokaj Wine Region Historic Cultural Landscape. However, its fame long predated this distinction because it is the origin of Tokaji aszú wine, the world's oldest botrytized wine.

Due to the Treaty of Trianon, a smaller part of the historical wine region now belongs to Slovakia.

Characteristics 
Some of the characteristics which make the Tokaj wine region unique are:

Soil and microclimate: The Tokaj terroir consists of clay or loess soil on volcanic subsoil. The microclimate is determined by the sunny, south-facing slopes and the proximity of the Tisza and Bodrog rivers, and is conducive to the proliferation of Botrytis (noble rot) and the subsequent desiccation of the grapes.
Indigenous grape varieties: Furmint and Hárslevelű have been cultivated in the region for centuries and, together with Yellow Muscat (Hungarian: Sárgamuskotály), Kabar, Kövérszőlő and Zéta, are the only grape varieties officially permitted for use in the region.
Cellars: A vast system of cellars was carved out of solid rock between 1400 and 1600 AD. They provide a constant temperature of around 10-12 °C. The cellars are covered with a characteristic mold, which feeds off the alcohol evaporated during aging and keeps the humidity in the range of 85-90%, which is ideal for the aging of Tokaji wines.
Appellation system: A royal decree in 1737 or 1757 established a closed production district in Tokaj, supposedly the world's earliest system of wine appellation (though the claim is disputed by Chianti, whose territory was defined in 1716). Vineyard classification began in 1730 and was completed by the national censuses of 1765 and 1772.

History 
Historical records show that vineyards had been established in Tokaj as early as the 12th century, but there is evidence for the earlier introduction of wine production to the region.

A number of experts claim that viticulture could have started in the Tokaj region as early as in the Celtic times, that is BC. A petrified grape leaf found in Erdőbénye and dating from the late 3rd century AD, points to the existence of viticulture in Roman times. Slavs arrived in the region in the late 5th/early 6th century. One possible origin for the name "Tokaj" is that it is derived from the Slavic word "Stokaj", meaning approximately confluence (i.e. confluence of the rivers Bodrog and Tisza). The Slovaks claim that Slavs continued previous viticulture in the region. Magyar settlers arrived in Tokaj from the end of the 9th Century and there is an alternative theory that viticulture was introduced to the region from the east, possibly by the Kabar tribe. The Magyars themselves seem to have had an ancient tradition of wine-making (see: Origins of Hungarian wine-making). Another possible origin for the name "Tokaj" is that it comes from an Armenian word meaning "grape".

Latin people were first invited to settle in Tokaj by Hungarian King Béla III (1172-1196) and then by Béla IV (1235-1270). These immigrants were probably Walloons from northern France, although some researchers claim that they were Italians. Slavic peoples (Slovaks and Rusyns) are also documented as being involved in Tokaj viticulture by the 12th century. However, the rise of Tokaj as a major wine region can be dated to the early 16th Century.

Around 1620 the Emperor imported a Walloon-French wine-farmer Duvont, who later invented what would be known as the "king of wines"-method in the Tokaji-district.

In honour of Mr. Duvont's exceptional skills, the Emperor ennobled this farmer, and gave him one of his many villages (Kiralyfalva), now Königsdorf in Austria. The emperor then named the family Királyfalvy.

Tokaji wine became an increasingly important commodity for the region from the 17th century, its export being a major source of income for the ruling princes of Transylvania to which the Tokaj region belonged at the time. Indeed, revenues from the increasingly renowned Tokaji Aszú wine helped to pay for the wars of independence fought against Austrian Habsburg rule. The repute of Tokaji wine was enhanced when in 1703, Francis II Rákóczi, prince of Transylvania, gave King Louis XIV of France a gift of numerous bottles of wine from his Tokaj estate. Tokaji wine was then served at the Versailles Court, where it became known under the name of Tokay. Delighted with the precious beverage, Louis XIV declared it "Vinum Regum, Rex Vinorum" ("Wine of Kings, King of Wines").

In the 18th Century, Tokaj reached the height of its prosperity. Both Poland and Russia had become major export markets for its wine. Such was the importance of Tokaji in Russia, that the Russian emperors maintained a de facto colony in Tokaj in order to guarantee the supply of wine to the Imperial Court.

The partition of Poland in 1795 and subsequent imposition of customs duties dealt a severe blow to the exports of Tokaji wine and precipitated the economic decline of the region. However, this was only the first of three major crises for Tokaj. The second occurred when the phylloxera epidemic reached Tokaj in 1885 and destroyed the vast majority of the vineyards in a matter of years. The third shock was when Hungary lost two-thirds of its territory under the peace Treaty of Trianon signed in June 1920, and thus Tokaj wine lost access to the majority of its domestic market. The region was also divided between Hungary and the newly created Czechoslovakia, which gained an area of 120 hectares (with the exception of 1938-1944, when Hungary took control over the territory). The latter now forms part of an adjoining wine region in Slovakia with approximately 908 hectares of classified Tokaj vineyards.

The era of communist rule in Hungary saw a deterioration in the quality and reputation of Tokaji wines. However, since 1990 a considerable amount of investment has gone into the Tokaj region, creating what has been dubbed as the "Tokaj Renaissance". There are now almost 600 wineries in the region, of which about 50 produce the full range of wines.

The "Designation of origin" dispute 

Tokaj wine is, by its unique character, a luxurious commodity with a strong appeal to the international market.

The dispute started in 1964 when, for the first time, the then Czechoslovakia exported its excessive production of Tokaj wine to Austria, the market that used to be solely supplied with this commodity by Hungary. The conflict of interests was settled in a bilateral agreement according to which Slovakia - at the expense of the Czech beer-related concession on Hungarian part - was only allowed to export its overproduction of Tokaj wine to Hungary (which consequently re-labeled and re-exported it). This agreement expired in 1990 after which date the dispute arose again.
An agreement was reached in June 2004 between the Hungarian and Slovak governments concerning the use of the Tokaj name in Slovakia. Under this agreement, wine produced on 5.65 km² of land in Slovakia is able to use the Tokaj name. However, the Slovak part did not observe their legally binding undertaking, which was to introduce the same standards enshrined in Hungarian wine laws since 1990. It has not yet been decided who will monitor or enforce those laws. The disputes led Slovakia into an international lawsuit between Hungary and five other countries (Italy, France, Australia, Serbia and Slovenia), for the brand name "Tokaji". (see details: Tokaji)

In November 2012, the European Court ruled against Hungary's request to erase the Slovak entry “Vinohradnícka oblasť Tokaj” from “E-Bacchus”, an electronic database containing a register of designations of origin and geographical indications protected in the EU. Hungary lodged an appeal against the judgement of the General Court. In February 2013, the EU Court of Justice has turned down the Hungarian appeal against an earlier ruling concerning Slovakia's registration of “Vinohradnícka oblasť Tokaj” (Tokaj Wine Region), which contains the name of Hungary's Tokaj region. In its ruling, the court said that Slovakia's registering its “Vinohradnícka oblasť Tokaj” in the European database E-Bacchus did not constitute an actionable measure. As a result, under the current EU legislation the wine-growing region of Tokaj is located in both Hungary and Slovakia. Therefore, wine producers from both the Hungarian Tokaj region and the Slovak Tokaj region may use the Tokaj brand name.

Tokaji wine

References

External links

UNESCO description: Tokaj Wine Region Historic Cultural Landscape
Tokaj - The Wine of Freedom (László Alkonyi, Budapest 2000).
Tokajwine -  Wine Encyclopedia and Review of over 2000 wines from Tokaj, by László Alkonyi
Terra Benedicta - Tokaj and Beyond (Gábor Rohály, Gabriella Mészáros, András Nagymarosy, Budapest 2003)
 Events and festivals in the Tokaj Wine Region
Tradition and Innovation in the Tokaj Region (Tim Atkin)
 Tokaj portal
 Tokaj and the historic Wine Region - tourism information
 Tokaj Wine Region on the European Wineroads portal (HUN)
 Tokaj-Hegyalja Attractions
 Lambert-Gócs, Miles. Tokaji Wine: Fame, Fate, Tradition. Board and Bench Publishing, 2010, 
 Tokaj wine region infoposter

 
World Heritage Sites in Hungary